No Bad Days may refer to:

No Bad Days, a 2014 EP by Sunset Sons
"No Bad Days", a song by Bastille from their 2022 album Give Me the Future
"No Bad Days", a song by Macklemore from his 2023 album Ben